Embidopsocus is a genus of booklice in the family Liposcelididae. There are more than 40 described species in Embidopsocus.

Species
These 44 species belong to the genus Embidopsocus:

 Embidopsocus angolensis Badonnel, 1955
 Embidopsocus antennalis Badonnel, 1949
 Embidopsocus bousemani Mockford, 1987
 Embidopsocus brasiliensis Badonnel, 1973
 Embidopsocus citrensis Mockford, 1963
 Embidopsocus congolensis Badonnel, 1948
 Embidopsocus cubanus Mockford, 1987
 Embidopsocus distinctus Badonnel, 1955
 Embidopsocus echinus Badonnel, 1955
 Embidopsocus enderleini (Ribaga, 1905)
 Embidopsocus femoralis (Badonnel, 1931)
 Embidopsocus flexuosus Badonnel, 1962
 Embidopsocus frater Badonnel, 1973
 Embidopsocus granulosus Badonnel, 1949
 Embidopsocus hainanicus Li, 2002
 Embidopsocus intermedius Badonnel, 1969
 Embidopsocus jikuni Li, 2002
 Embidopsocus kumaonensis Badonnel, 1981
 Embidopsocus laticeps Mockford, 1963
 Embidopsocus lenah Schmidt & New, 2008
 Embidopsocus leucomelas (Enderlein, 1910)
 Embidopsocus luteus Hagen, 1866
 Embidopsocus machadoi Badonnel, 1955
 Embidopsocus mendax Badonnel, 1973
 Embidopsocus mexicanus Mockford, 1987
 Embidopsocus minor (Pearman, 1931)
 Embidopsocus needhami (Enderlein, 1903)
 Embidopsocus oleaginus (Hagen, 1865)
 Embidopsocus pallidus Badonnel, 1955
 Embidopsocus paradoxus (Enderlein, 1904)
 Embidopsocus pauliani Badonnel, 1955
 Embidopsocus pilosus Badonnel, 1973
 Embidopsocus porphyreus Li, 2002
 Embidopsocus sacchari Mockford, 1996
 Embidopsocus similis Badonnel, 1973
 Embidopsocus thorntoni Badonnel, 1971
 Embidopsocus trichurensis Menon, 1942
 Embidopsocus trifasciatus Badonnel, 1973
 Embidopsocus vilhenai Badonnel, 1955
 Embidopsocus virgatus (Enderlein, 1904)
 Embidopsocus zhouyaoi Li, 2002
 † Embidopsocus eocenicus Nel, De Ploeg & Azar, 2004
 † Embidopsocus pankowskiorum Engel, 2016
 † Embidopsocus saxonicus Günther, 1989

References

Liposcelididae
Articles created by Qbugbot